Kele  or KELE may refer to:


People 

 Kevin Kele (born 1998), Slovak footballer
 Kele Le Roc (born 1975), British R&B and UK garage singer
 Kele Leawere (born 1974), Fijian rugby union player
 Kele Okereke (born 1981), English musician

Languages

Other uses 
 Kélé, an Afro-Lucian religion
 Kele, Ethiopia, a town
 Kele (river), Yakutia, Russia
 KELE (AM), a radio station (1360 AM) licensed to serve Mountain Grove, Missouri, United States
 KELE-FM, a radio station (92.5 FM) licensed to serve Mountain Grove, Missouri

See also
 KELE (disambiguation)